State Route 284 (SR 284) is a  state highway in Van Buren County in the central portion and in Bledsoe County in the eastern portion of the U.S. state of Tennessee. It serves as a connector for SR 111 and SR 30 to Fall Creek Falls State Resort Park.

Route description

SR 284 begins in Van Buren County at an interchange with SR 111 south of Spencer, the route heads east Piney Road, it the turns north onto a former alignment of SR 111 and turns back to east as Archie Rhinehart Parkway to Fall Creek Falls State Resort Park. Just past the entrance to the park it briefly passes through Bledsoe County before it returns to Van Buren County and becomes a divided two lane road and becomes Park Road. At an intersection where Park Road goes straight the main part of the park, SR 284 turns northeast and bypasses the main section of the park and makes a half loop. In the northern part of the park SR 284 meets back up with Park Road. SR 284 turns north and leaves the park 1.3 miles past the Park Road intersection at the Visitors Center. The route ends at SR 30 between Spencer and Mount Crest.

Major intersections

See also
 
 
 List of state routes in Tennessee

References

External links

284
Transportation in Bledsoe County, Tennessee
Transportation in Van Buren County, Tennessee
Protected areas of Bledsoe County, Tennessee
Protected areas of Van Buren County, Tennessee